Astalaxmi Shakya was sworn in as Minority Chief Minister of Bagmati Province on 18 August 2021. After the split of CPN(UML), she's been working on Interim capacity while opposition has claimed majority. She became Chief Minister after the resignation of outgoing chief minister Dormani Poudel as both the parliamentary party leader and chief minister. Here is the list of Minister.

Chief minister and cabinet ministers

See also 
Astalaxmi Shakya
 Sher Dhan Rai cabinet
 Lalbabu Raut cabinet
 Krishna Chandra Nepali cabinet
Kul Prasad KC cabinet
 Mahendra Bahadur Shahi cabinet
 Trilochan Bhatta cabinet

References

External links 

 Office of Chief Minister and Council of Ministers of Bagmati Province

Provincial cabinets of Nepal
Bagmati Province